The K4 League is the fourth tier of the South Korean football league system. After 2019, the semi-professional Korea National League and the former amateur K3 League were rebranded into the current K3 League and K4 League.

Competition format
The promotion and relegation system exists between the K3 League and the K4 League, both being semi-professional leagues. However, since the 2021 season, teams from professional leagues K League 1 and K League 2 were allowed to create reserve teams set to play in the K4 League, in order to give academy players and/or other registered players more game time.

Current clubs

Former clubs
The list does not include promoted or relegated clubs.

Champions

Titles by season

Titles by club

See also
 K3 League
 K3 League (2007–2019)
 South Korean football league system

References

External links
 K4 League official website at KFA 

K4 League 
2020 establishments in South Korea
4
Sports leagues established in 2020
Fourth level football leagues in Asia
Professional sports leagues in South Korea